Malcolm Martin (born September 19, 1992), professionally known as Thelonious Martin or King Thelonious is an American hip hop record producer from Chicago, Illinois. He is a member of the Chicago collective Savemoney.

Life and career
Malcolm Martin was born on September 19, 1992 in Chicago, Illinois. However, shortly afterwards he and his mother moved to New Jersey.

Martin states his love for music started when he was 14 after watching the late night network Adult Swim and hearing a song by late Hip hop producer J Dilla. He later became a fan of other Underground hip hop producers, most notably Madlib. After graduating from Montclair High School, Thelonious moved back to Chicago joining forces with SAVEMONEY, led by Vic Mensa. He began producing for members of the group throughout 2011 and in 2012, he produced the tracks "Ave." and "If Heaven is a Ghetto" for Odd Future's Hodgy Beats's EP Untitled. Later that year, he appeared on the Pro Era mixtape PEEP: The Aprocalypse, producing the song "K.I.N.G.S." performed by Joey Badass and Capital STEEZ

Later that year, collaborated with the Odd Future group MellowHigh for their single "Go" released on April 20. In 2013, he began to work with rapper Curren$y on his mixtape New Jet City. Months after the mixtape release, he began to work with Action Bronson and produced 2 songs on New Jersey rapper Da$h's critically acclaimed mixtape V.I.C.E.S.. Later that year, he collaborated with rapper Retch for his mixtape Polo Sporting Goods, entirely produced by Martin.

In 2014, produced half of Curren$y's mixtape Drive In the Theater.  He later produced "The Ghost of Dipset" for New York rapper Smoke DZA for his album Dream.ZONE.Achieve. Later that year he released the song "Her" featuring Mac Miller. The song was released as a promotional single for his upcoming album. He later released the song "Atlantis" featuring Curren$y and Odd Future's Domo Genesis. Along with the song he released the album title, artwork, and track list. On December 2, 2014, he released his debut album Wünderkid, entirely produced by himself and featured Curren$y, Domo Genesis, Retch, Mac Miller, Ab-Soul, Smoke DZA, and more. He later had his song "September" featured on Adult Swim. He also produced the song "Back Home" for A$AP Rocky's sophomore album At.Long.Last.A$AP.

In 2015, Martin had collaborated with Rhode Island musician and designer Theo Martins. The two began collaborating after confusion over similarities between their names became incessant. "Show Me Around", which debuted on Okayplayer was warmly received and the two began work on a full length. "Bad Tendencies" premiered on The Fader September 28, 2016 and the two announced a collaborative EP. Theo Martins cites Odd Future member Anwar Carrots as the fuel behind collaborating with Martin.

Influences
Martin has stated that he is influenced by Madlib, MF DOOM, J Dilla, Flying Lotus, Alchemist, Pete Rock, and Just Blaze.

Discography

Studio albums
 Wünderkid (2014)
 Late Night Programming (2016)

Collaborative albums
 Molotov (with Saga) (2017)
 TM (with Theo Martins) (2017)
 As It Is in Heaven (with Jabee) (2018)
 Deliver Us from Evil (with Jabee) (2018)
 Thy Will Be Done (with Jabee) (2019)
 5-Series (with Jacob Rochester) (2020)
 Patchworks (with Jacob Rochester) (2021)

Production discography

2012

Hodgy Beats – untitled
 06. "Ave."
 08. "If Heaven Is a Ghetto"

Skyzoo – Theo vs. JJ (Dreams vs. Reality)
 03. "Fulfillment"
 04. "Ever Loyal"

Curren$y – Priest Andretti
 08. "Talk My Shit"

Freeway – Freedom of Speech
 10. "Let You Know"

Pro Era – PEEP: The aPROcalypse
 13. "K.I.N.G.S." (performed by Joey Bada$$ and Capital STEEZ)

Curren$y - 3 Piece Set / A Closed Session
 01. "Pick N Roll" (featuring Young Roddy)"
 02. "Can't Get Out" (featuring Young Roddy)
 03. "Yella Cab"

2013

Joey Bada$$
 "Wendy-n-Becky" (featuring Chance the Rapper)

Le$ – E36
 11. "Autobahn" (featuring Smoke DZA)

Alex Wiley – Club Wiley
 14. "Icky Woods" (featuring Action Bronson)

Dash – V.I.C.E.S
 08. "Brighton Beach"
 11. "22 Tabs"

Showyousuck – One Man Pizza Party 4: Slice After Death
 04. "Flip Phone"

World's Fair – Bastards of the Party
 03. "Heathrow" (performed by Children of the Night)

Curren$y & Young Roddy – Bales
 10. "Walkie Talkies"

Kool A.D. – Not O.K.
 07. "PLVYVHVT3" (featuring Jabee)

RetcH - Polo Sporting Goods
 01. Graceful Jewelry Removal
 02. Marmalade Sky
 03. Burgundy Windbreaker
 04. Odd Sweaters 1992
 05. Pimp Sport
 06. Short $ermons (featuring Ab-Soul)
 07. Special Jim
 08. 850 Music (Morimoto Drug Transactions) (featuring Action Bronson)
 09. Since My Dog Died
 10. Paul Allen's Business Card (featuring Sulaiman)
 11. Blue Fin Tuna (featuring Da$h)

2014

Smoke DZA – Dream. Zone. Achieve
 03. "Ghost of Dipset" (featuring Cam'ron)

Curren$y - The Drive In Theatre
 01. Introduction
 04. Vintage Vineyard
 05. Stolen
 07. E.T. (featuring B-Real)
 08. Grew Up In This (featuring Young Roddy & Freddie Gibbs)
 09. M.P.R. 
 12. Hi Top Whites

2015

ASAP Rocky – At. Long. Last. ASAP
 18. "Back Home" (featuring Mos Def, A-Cyde & ASAP Yams)

Skyzoo – Music for My Friends
 06. "See a Key (Ki)" (featuring Jadakiss)
 10. "Women Who Can Cook"

RetcH – Finesse the World
 07. "Bad Luck"
 10. "Dirty Ginger Ale"

2016

Joey Purp - iiiDrops
 06. "Cornerstone" (featuring Saba & theMIND)
 08. "Godbody"
 10. "Winners Circle" (featuring Vic Mensa)

Hannibal King – Don't Die
 05. "88"

Hodgy Beats – Dukkha
 01. "Anime"

Xavier Omär - The Everlasting Wave
 02. "Grown Woman"
 05. "Do Not Disturb" (co-produced with Carter Lang, Peter Cottontale and Will Miller)

Curren$y - Andretti 10/30
 02. "Lifers"

2017

G Herbo - Humble Beast
 01. "Street" (co-produced with Isaac Burns)

IDK - IWASVERYBAD
 11. "Black Sheep, White Dove" (co-produced with ByLoFi)

2018

G Herbo - Humble Beast (Deluxe Edition)
 24. "Shook"

Joey Purp - Quarterthing
 01. "24k Gold / Sanctified" (featuring Ravyn Lenae & Jack Red)
 13. "LEBRON JAMES" (co-produced with CameOne)

2019

IDK - Is He Real?
 14. "Julia..." (co-produced with IDK)

2020

Curren$y - 3 Piece Set
 01. "52 Seconds"
 02. "Survivor's Remorse"
 03. "Rag Top Love Affair"

Peter CottonTale - Catch
 11. "Find You (New Jerusalem)" (co-produced with Peter CottonTale)

Vic Mensa - V TAPE
 02. "Machiavelli" (featuring Eryn Allen Kane) (co-produced with SC and Amir Johnson)
 05. "Bethlehem / SC Freestyle" (co-produced with SC and Niko the Great)

Femdot - Buy One Get One Free, Vol. 1
 02. "Back Home"

2021

Topaz Jones - Don't Go Tellin' Your Momma
 13. "Buggin'" (co-produced with Topaz Jones, Jack Hallenbeck and Alissia)

Skyzoo - All the Brilliant Things
 03. "A Tour in the Neighbourhood" (featuring Al Skratch)

Amaria - Bittersweet
 03. "Got Me Like" (featuring Mick Jenkins) (co-produced with Tee-Watt and Niko the Great)

Mick Jenkins - Elephant in the Room
 01. The Valley of the Shadow of Death (co-produced with Tee-Watt and Renzell)

Radamiz – Every Bad Day Has Good News
 02. "Ash Wednesday"

2022

Marcel Allen - Ebony Goddess
 01. "Dinner Wit Hov"
 02. "SALT!" (featuring Havoc) (co-produced with Jacob Rochester)
 05. "4EvaStackin" (featuring Boldy James)
 06. "Silver Surfer" (co-produced with Jacob Rochester)
 07. "Dead Wrong" (co-produced with Jacob Rochester)
 08. "Goddess" (co-produced with Jacob Rochester)

Cam'ron & A-Trak - U Wasn't There
 01. "This is My City (Federal Reserve Version)" (co-produced with A-Trak)

G Herbo - Survivor's Remorse
 1-07. "Real Rap" (featuring Benny the Butcher) (co-produced with CameOne and Gerson Zaragoza)
 1-09. "Shordie" (featuring Gunna) (co-produced with Oz on the Track and Don Rob)
 2-07. "Machines" (featuring Conway the Machine)

References

1992 births
Living people